The following is the complete list of the 481 Virtual Console titles available for the Wii U in Japan sorted by system and release date. English translations are highlighted between parenthesis.

Available titles

Famicom
There are currently 131 Famicom games and 18 Disk System games available to purchase.

Super Famicom
There are currently 101 games available to purchase.

Nintendo 64
There are currently 22 games available to purchase.

Game Boy Advance
There are currently 102 games available to purchase.

Nintendo DS
There are currently 31 games available to purchase.

PC Engine
There are currently 44 PC Engine games, 1 CD-ROM² game, and 7 Super CD-ROM² games available to purchase.

MSX
There are currently 16 MSX games and 7 MSX2 games available to purchase.

See also
 List of Virtual Console games for Wii (Japan)
 List of Virtual Console games for Nintendo 3DS (Japan)
 List of Wii games on Wii U eShop

References

 Japan
Virtual Console games for Wii U
Virtual Console games for Wii U